Leask may refer to:

Places
 Leask, Saskatchewan, a village in Canada
 Rural Municipality of Leask No. 464, in Canada
 Leask Airport, adjacent to the village

People
 Ada Leask (1899–1987), Irish historian and antiquary
 Clan Leask, a Lowland Scottish clan
 Derek Leask (born 1948), New Zealand diplomat
 Henry Leask (1913–2004), British Army officer
 Julie Leask,  Australian social scientist 
 Kenneth Leask (1896–1974), British officer of the Royal Air Force
 Laurie Leask (1912–1981), Australian rules footballer
 Marilyn Leask (born 1950), Australian professor of education
 Michael Leask (born 1990), Scottish cricketer
 Nigel Leask (born 1958), British academic publisher
 Ranald Leask, Scottish public relations and media manager
 Rob Leask (born 1971), Canadian-German ice hockey coach
 William Keith Leask (1857–1925), Scottish writer and a classics lecturer
 John Leask Lumley (1930–2015), American professor of mechanical engineering and aerospace engineering

Other uses
 Leask v Commonwealth, a High Court of Australia case that discussed the role of proportionality in the Australian Constitution